Chitembo is a town and municipality in Bié Province in Angola. The municipality had a population of 78,156 in 2014.

References

Populated places in Bié Province
Municipalities of Angola